Loretta Hidalgo Whitesides is a public speaker, co-creator of Yuri's Night, and an author on space exploration. She accumulated over five hours of weightless time as a Flight Director for Zero-G Corporation, and plans to travel to space as a "Founder Astronaut" on Virgin Galactic's SpaceShipTwo with her husband George T. Whitesides.

Whitesides received a bachelor's degree in biology from Stanford and a master's from Caltech, with a particular interest in astrobiology. In relation to that work she appeared in the 3D IMAX documentary "Aliens of the Deep" alongside director James Cameron traveling to hydrothermal vents two miles under the ocean. She has also visited Haughton impact crater in the arctic to study plants surviving in extreme environments. In addition, she has given numerous TEDx talks about space exploration and personal development.

Publications
 Cockell, Charles S, Pascal Lee, Andrew C Schuerger, Loretta Hidalgo, Jeff A Jones, and M Dale Stokes. 2001. "Microbiology and Vegetation of Micro-Oases and Polar Desert, Haughton Impact Crater, Devon Island, Nunavut, Canada". Arctic, Antarctic, and Alpine Research. 33, no. 3: 306.
 Whitesides, L. (2008, January 31). Space, The Final Frontier for Homosexuality. Retrieved from https://www.wired.com/2008/01/space-the-final/

Speaking 

 Whitesides, L. (2009, November). Loretta Hidalgo Whitesides: A Foundation for the Next Space Generation [Video File]. Retrieved from https://www.ted.com/tedx/events/170
 Whitesides, L. (2015, September). Loretta Hidalgo Whitesides: What is your mission? [Video File]. Retrieved from http://tedxpasadena.org/2015-momentum/
 Whitesides, L. (2017, November). Loretta Hidalgo Whitesides: Can space exploration bring out the best in all of us? [Video File]. Retrieved from https://www.ted.com/talks/loretta_hidalgo_whitesides_can_space_exploration_bring_out_the_best_in_all_of_us

Books

References

External links
 "The New Right Stuff"
 “The World Space Party: TMRO Interviews Loretta Hidalgo Whitesides - March 25, 2017”
 “It’s Up To Us: GeekDad Interviews Loretta Hidalgo Whitesides”
 “Cuppa and chat with Loretta Whitesides from Galactic Unite”
 
 
 "10% Happier Podcast with Dan Harris - February 13, 2019"
 Space, The Final Frontier for Homosexuality
 Pasadena woman stages global celebration honoring Soviet hero Yuri Gagarin, first man in space

Stanford University alumni
California Institute of Technology alumni
Living people
Year of birth missing (living people)